Michael Curtiz (1886–1962) was a Hungarian-born American film director whose career spanned from 1912 to 1961.  During this period he directed, wholly or in part, 181 films.  He began his cinematic career in Hungary, then moved to Austria and finally the United States.  As his biographer Alan K. Rode notes, "A cinematic pioneer, Curtiz made a seamless transition from hand-cranking cameras in silent films to directing the first sound feature where the characters spoke their parts. He led the way in two- and three-color Technicolor, directed the first motion-picture produced in VistaVision, and worked extensively in CinemaScope." Rode also notes that "he helmed rousing adventures, westerns, musicals, war movies, romances, historical dramas, horror films, tearjerkers, melodramas, comedies, spectacles, and film noirs."

Born in Budapest, Curtiz graduated from Hungary's Royal Academy of Theatre and Art in 1906. After six years as a stage actor and director he joined the nascent Hungarian film industry. His first film credit was the 1912 drama, Maés Holnap ("Today and Tomorrow"). In 1913, after directing several films, Curtiz traveled to Denmark to hone his skills as an apprentice for director August Blom.  Returning to Hungary, he became a freelance director for several film companies. In 1919, Curtiz immigrated to Vienna and became one of Austria's top film directors.  His first film there was Die Dame Mit Dem Schwarzen Handschuh ("The Lady with the Black Gloves", 1919), starring his wife, Lucy Doraine. Among his subsequent Austrian films were the two-part epic Sodom and Gomorrah (1922) and Die Sklavenkönigin ("The Slave Queen", 1924).  The latter film was released in the United Kingdom as The Moon of Israel. Harry Warner, one of the founders of Warner Bros., instructed his brother Jack to view the film. After doing so, they were impressed enough to offer Curtiz a contract to direct in the United States.

In 1926, Curtiz began his American career with The Third Degree starring Dolores Costello.  He followed this with several more films starring her, including the part-talking biblical epic Noah's Ark (1928).  In 1932 and 1933, respectively, Curtiz directed the two-color Technicolor horror films Doctor X and Mystery of the Wax Museum, both starring Lionel Atwill and Fay Wray. In 1935, Curtiz directed the swashbuckling adventure Captain Blood, which made major stars of Errol Flynn and Olivia de Havilland.  He followed this with several move adventure films starring them, including The Charge of the Light Brigade (1936), The Adventures of Robin Hood (1938), and Dodge City (1939), and Flynn in The Sea Hawk (1940). During this period, Curtiz also made the gangster films, Kid Galahad (1937), starring Edward G. Robinson, Bette Davis, and Humphrey Bogart, and Angels with Dirty Faces (1938) with James Cagney and Bogart, and the dramatic film Four Daughters (1939), which brought stardom to John Garfield.  In 1941, he directed Robinson and Garfield in The Sea Wolf. During the war years (1941–1945), Curtiz directed James Cagney and Joan Crawford into Academy Award winning performances with, respectively, Yankee Doodle Dandy (1942) and Mildred Pierce (1945).  In between these, Curtiz directed his magnum opus, Casablanca (1942), with Humphrey Bogart and Ingrid Bergman, which won the Academy Award for Best Picture and Curtiz's only Academy Award for Best Director.

In the post-war years, Curtiz directed Life with Father (1947), an adaptation of a popular Broadway play, and the film noir The Unsuspected (1948), his first film by his own production company.  For his company, he also produced and directed Romance on the High Seas (1948), a musical which marked the film debut of Doris Day.  Curtiz eventually disbanded his company and remained a contract director with Warner Bros. until 1954. Among his later films under his Warners contract was another film noir, The Breaking Point, starring John Garfield. After leaving Warner Bros., Curtiz directed White Christmas (1954) for Paramount Pictures, the first film in VistaVision and the highest-grossing film in his career. Also for Paramount, he directed the Elvis Presley vehicle, King Creole (1958).  In 1961, Curtiz directed his final film, The Comancheros, with John Wayne.
 
For his contribution to cinema, Curtiz was awarded a star on the Hollywood Walk of Fame. In the 1998 and 2007 listings of the American Film Institute's Greatest American Films, Casablanca ranked, respectively, in second and third place, while Yankee Doodle Dandy ranked 100 on the first list and 98 on the second. As of 2018, four films directed by Curtiz have been added to the National Film Registry: The Adventures of Robin Hood, Casablanca, Mildred Pierce, and Yankee Doodle Dandy.

Filmography
The filmography of Michael Curtiz is derived from the one presented in the biography by Alan K. Rode.

Hungarian films: 1912–1913
Michael Curtiz was born Mano Kaminer in Budapest in 1886.  In 1906, he graduated from Hungary's Royal Academy of Theatre and Art in 1906. Under the stage name of Mihály Kertész, he established himself as a stage actor, performing in classical and modern theatrical dramas.  Eventually he turned to directed as well.  In 1912, Kertész entered Hungary's motion picture industry as an actor and director for the Projectograph Film Company.  His first film for them was also the company's initial feature. All of Curtiz's films from this period are lost.

Danish film: 1913
In July 1913, Kertész left Hungary and travelled to Denmark to train as a film director.  There he went to work for the Nordisk Film Company as an assistant director to August Blom.

Hungarian films: 1914–1919
After six months in Denmark, Mihály Kertész returned to Hungary. There he returned as a film director alternating between the Projectograph, Uher, and Kino-Riport companies. With the coming of World War I in 1914, Kertész was called up by the Austro-Hungarian army and served as an artillery officer.  After being discharged in 1915, he resumed filmmaking and married actress Lucy Doraine, who would star in several of his films. In 1917, a new film company, Phönix-Film was formed by the merger of Projectagraph and Star-Film Productions. Kertész served as their head of production until 1919. Except were noted, all of the films from this period are lost.

Austrian films: 1919–1926
In 1919, a communist government was established for a brief time in Hungary.  This prompted Kertész to migrate to Austria where he began working for the Sascha-Film Company.  By the end of 1920 he had established himself as the company's top director. As in Hungary, his wife, Lucy Doraine, appeared in several of his Austrian films.  They divorced in 1923. Except where noted, the films from this period survive and were made for the Sascha-Film Company.

American films – the Warner Bros. years: 1926–1953
In 1926, Mihály Kertész accepted an offer from Warner Bros. to come to the United States and direct films. He arrived that June and anglicized his name to Michael Curtiz.  He would remain at Warners for 28 years. During that time he directed 87 films, married screenwriter Bess Meredyth in 1929, and became an American citizen in 1936. Except where indicated, all of Curtiz's Warner Bros. films survive.

American films – the final years: 1954–1961
In 1954, Curtiz left Warner Bros. and spend the remaining years of his career working for various studios, notably Paramount and 20th Century-Fox. In 1961, during production of his final film, The Comancheros, Curtiz learned that he was suffering from incurable cancer.  He died the following year.

Awards and honors

Academy Awards
Listed below are all the films directed by Michael Curtiz that received Academy Award nominations for Best Picture, Best Director, Best Actor, Best Actress, Best Supporting Actor, or Best Supporting Actress.

National Film Registry
As of 2020, four films directed by Michael Curtiz have been added to the National Film Registry.

AFI's 100 Years...100 Movies
In 1998, the American Film Institute presented their list of the 100 Greatest American films.  They revised the list in 2007. Two films directed by Michael Curtiz were included on the list both times.

References

Notes

Footnotes

Bibliography

External links

Literature on Michael Curtiz
Kertész Kaminer Manó (aka Kertész Mihály) profile

Director filmographies
 
American filmographies